Too Beautiful to Lie (lit. "Don't Believe Her") is a 2004 South Korean romantic comedy film about a beautiful ex-con and a naive village pharmacist.

Plot 
Yeong-ju is a girl with cute looks, an innocent smile, and a brilliant talker. She is also in prison for fraud. She easily convinces the evaluation board to grant her parole in time to attend her older sister's wedding. As soon as she's released, she boards a train for Busan with the wooden ducks she'd handcrafted as her wedding gift. On the train, she sits across village pharmacist Hee-cheol, who is on his way to propose to his girlfriend with his deceased mother's family heirloom ring. Yeong-ju witnesses a pickpocket stealing the ring from Hee-cheol, and afraid of becoming the suspect and violating her parole, she steals the ring back for Hee-cheol. But in the process, she is unable to board the train on time, missing it and leaving her wedding gift bag on the train.

Determined to find her bag, she tracks down Hee-cheol, and arrives in his hometown Yonggang Village. But the situation becomes complicated when his family members mistake her as their future daughter-in-law due to the ring, welcoming her to the family. Unwilling to tell them the truth so that she can find her bag then leave, Yeong-ju sweetly plays along, even telling them that Hee-cheol is the father of her unborn child. Meanwhile, Hee-cheol, who wasn't able to make the marriage proposal because of the lost ring, comes back home with a heavy heart. He is enraged to find himself in the middle of Yeong-ju's schemes. Worst of all, no one believes him, thinking he had abandoned his poor pregnant fiancée, and he ends up miserably kicked out of the family home.

As a showdown brews between Yeong-ju and Hee-cheol, pitting truth vs. lies, they gradually get to know each other and fall in love.

Cast 
 Kim Ha-neul ... Joo Yeong-ju
 Gang Dong-won ... Choi Hee-cheol
 Song Jae-ho ... Hee-cheol's father
 Kim Ji-young ... Hee-cheol's grandma
 Ku Hye-ryung ... Hee-cheol's aunt
 Lee Chun-hee ... Young-deok
 Nam Soo-jung ... Hee-cheol's aunt
 Lee Ju-seok ... Doctor
 Lee Young-eun ... Soo-mi
 Im Ha-ryong ... Hee-cheol's uncle 
 Myeong Ji-yeon ... Hwa-sook
Nam Sang-mi ... Jae-eun
 Ryu Tae-ho ... Hee-cheol's uncle
 Kim Jae-rok ... pickpocket 
 Park Yong-jin ... Man-seok
 Jin Kyung ... Joo Young-ok 
 Son Young-soon ... grandmother in front of the restaurant
 Lee Mi-eun ... hairdresser
 Lee Jae-gu 
 Park Jae-woong 
 Kwon Tae-won  
 Park Gun-tae ... child at the pharmacy

Awards and nominations
2004 Baeksang Arts Awards
 Best Actress – Kim Ha-neul
 Nomination – Best Screenplay – Choi Hee-dae, Park Yeon-seon

2004 Grand Bell Awards
 Nomination – Best Actress – Kim Ha-neul
 Nomination – Best New Actor – Gang Dong-won

2004 Blue Dragon Film Awards
 Nomination – Best Actress – Kim Ha-neul

2004 Korean Film Awards
 Nomination – Best New Actor – Gang Dong-won

2004 Director's Cut Awards
 Best New Actor – Gang Dong-won

References

External links 
 
 
 
 Too Beautiful to Lie review at LoveHKFilm.com

2004 films
2004 romantic comedy films
South Korean romantic comedy films
Cinema Service films
2000s Korean-language films
2000s South Korean films